Prime News is an American television news program that aired on HLN from February 2005 to June 2012. The program featured "controversy, opinion, your point of view" (as announced at the beginning of the show), and aired Monday through Friday nights from 6PM to 7PM eastern, with a weekend highlight edition in which stories from the past week were recapped.

Format
Previously known as Prime News Tonight and Prime News with Erica Hill, the program recaps the news of the day, covering any number of subjects at a slower pace than programming on other networks, an example being The Fox Report on Fox News Channel.

Erica Hill and Mike Galanos used to co-anchor the show.  Galanos was reassigned to anchor morning rolling news coverage in 2006 while Hill left the show on January 25, 2008 to take-on a bigger role on the mother network's Anderson Cooper 360. Shortly after Hill's departure, Galanos returned to the program he once co-hosted a few years earlier. There are occasions where a guest host will take over the show. Past guest hosts have included Vinnie Politan and Jim Moret. On Monday, March 29, 2010, the show was reduced from two hours to one hour due to the move of the live telecast of Showbiz Tonight to 5PM eastern.

The program consisted of news segments from CNN, to discussions about selected subjects with analysts from CNN, to showcasing the most popular stories from CNN.com and stories from across the nation and world in a different number of segments.
 "Get to the Point" was a segment on "Prime News" where Galanos asks the tough questions while exploring controversial issues of faith, morals and values.
 "'Prime News' Investigates" was where former correspondent Richelle Carey would dig deep to give viewers the facts on interesting stories across the country.

External links
 CNN Headline News on CNN.com
 Prime News Official Website

CNN Headline News original programming